Al-Qasas (The Story) is the 28th chapter (sūrah) of the holy Qur'an with 88 verses (āyāt).

According to Ibn Kathir's commentary, the chapter takes its name from verse 25 in which the word Al-Qasas occurs. Lexically, qasas means to relate events in their proper sequence. Thus, from the viewpoint of the meaning too, this word can be a suitable title for this Surah, for in it the detailed story of the Prophet Moses has been related, also it includes story of Qarun from verse 76 to verse 83, explaining how Qarun was proud of himself thinking that his huge wealth earned by his own science, denying the grace of God on him, and later God destroyed him with his wealth underground.

Summary
1-2 Muhammad receives the story of Moses for the benefit of believers
3 Pharaoh oppresses the Israelites
4-5 God determines to befriend the weak and to destroy oppressors
6 Moses's mother directed to commit her child to the river
7-8 Pharaoh's family take up the infant Moses
9-10 The anxiety of Moses's mother—his sister watches him
11-12 Moses refuses the Egyptian nurse, and his mother is employed
13 God bestows on him wisdom and strength
14-20 He slays an Egyptian and flies to Madian
21-22 By divine direction he reaches the wells of Madian
23-24 He waters the flocks of the daughters of Shuaib (Jethro)
25 Meeting Shuaib, he relates his history
26-28 Shuaib gives him one of his daughters in marriage
29 Fulfilling the marriage contract, Moses journeys towards Egypt
29-32 He sees the burning bush, and receives prophetic commission and power to perform miracles
33-35 Moses, fearing Pharaoh, asks the help of Aaron
36 Egyptians regard Moses and Aaron as sorcerers
37 Moses threatens them with God's judgment
38 Pharaoh, claiming to be a god, asks Hámán to build a tower up to heaven
38-39 Pharaoh and his princes blaspheme God
40 God drowns Pharaoh and his princes in the sea
41-42 They shall be rejected of God in the resurrection
43 Moses receives the Pentateuch for a direction to his people
44-46 Muhammad inspired to preach to the Arabs
47 His preaching renders unbelievers inexcusable
48 The Quraish reject both Pentateuch and Quran
49 They are challenged to produce a better book than these
50-53 The Makkans warned by the faith of certain Jews 
54 Reward of converted Jews and Christians
55 Character of true converts to Islam
56 Allah guides whomever he wills
57 The Quraish fear to follow Muhammad lest they be expelled from Makkah
58-59 Cities destroyed for unbelief in, and persecution of, God's true prophets
60-61 Present prosperity no sign of God's favour
62-64 False gods will desert their votaries in judgment-day
65-67 The idolaters shall be speechless then, but penitents shall be saved
70-73 God, the only true God, produces the recurrence of day and night
74-75 God shall produce a witness against every nation at the judgment
76-82 The story of Qárún
83-85 Pardon granted to the humble and obedient
86 Muhammad received the Quran unexpectedly
86-88 Muhammad exhorted to steadfastness in the faith of Islam

References

Further reading

External links
Q28:2, 50+ translations, islamawakened.com
Quran 28 Quran.com

Qasas